Megadeth is an American thrash metal band formed by guitarist/vocalist Dave Mustaine after he was fired from Metallica. The first line-up after their name change from "Fallen Angels" featured Mustaine, vocalist Lor Kane and bassist David Ellefson briefly in 1983, the band was later joined by guitarist Greg Handevidt and drummer Dijon Carruthers, with Lor Kane leaving and Mustaine taking up lead vocals. Megadeth recorded Last Rites, a three-song demo. The demo featured drummer Lee Rausch. Slayer guitarist Kerry King covered live dates while a permanent replacement was sought. This lineup was short-lived and after a few shows in 1984, Lee Rausch was replaced by jazz fusion drummer Gar Samuelson, in addition to the second guitarist Chris Poland. During Megadeth's 1985 tour promoting their debut album, Killing Is My Business... and Business Is Good!, Poland left the band and was temporarily replaced by Mike Albert. Poland then rejoined Megadeth in October of the same year, shortly before they began work on Peace Sells... but Who's Buying?. After years of problems stemming from substance abuse, Mustaine fired both Poland and Samuelson before recording the third album So Far, So Good... So What!, being replaced by Jeff Young and Chuck Behler, respectively.

During their world tour in support of So Far, So Good... in February 1988, Mustaine noticed problems developing with Behler. Six months later, Mustaine fired both Behler and Young. In July 1989, Nick Menza was hired to replace Behler on the drums. After a lengthy search for a new lead guitarist, Megadeth enlisted Marty Friedman, who officially joined in February 1990. The lineup remained unchanged for almost eight years, until Menza discovered a tumor on his knee, which forced him to leave the tour to undergo surgery. He was replaced by Jimmy DeGrasso, temporarily at first. Following the Ozzfest tour in 1998, however, DeGrasso replaced Menza permanently, after Mustaine claimed that Menza had "lied about having cancer". Following the release of Risk, the band began a new world tour in September 1999. Three months into the tour, Friedman announced that he would be leaving the band, citing "musical differences". Megadeth enlisted guitarist Al Pitrelli as Friedman's replacement in January 2000. In early 2002, Mustaine suffered several injuries, which led him to announce in a press release that Megadeth had disbanded. Following nearly a year of recovery, Mustaine began work on what was to be his first solo album. The new material was recorded with session musicians Vinnie Colaiuta and Jimmy Lee Sloas, but the project was put on hold when Mustaine agreed to remix and remaster Megadeth's eight-album back catalog with Capitol Records.

In May 2004, Mustaine returned to his newest recordings, intended as a solo effort, but because of outstanding contractual obligations with the band's European label EMI, he was forced to release one more album under the "Megadeth" name. Mustaine decided to reform the band, and contacted the Rust in Peace line-up to re-record backing tracks on his latest songs. While drummer Nick Menza initially signed on, Marty Friedman and David Ellefson were both unable to come to an agreement with Mustaine. Chris Poland was hired by Mustaine to contribute only with guitar solos to the new album.  Megadeth began a world tour in October 2004, enlisting bassist James MacDonough and guitarist Glen Drover. While in rehearsal for the tour, newly returned drummer Nick Menza once again parted ways with the band, as he was unable to prepare for the physical demands of a full U.S. tour. He was replaced five days before the first show by Shawn Drover, brother of new guitarist Glen Drover. In February 2006, MacDonough left the band, citing "personal differences" for his decision, and was replaced by bassist James LoMenzo. Two years later, Dave Mustaine announced that Glen Drover had quit Megadeth to focus on his family. He was replaced by Chris Broderick. On February 8, 2010, David Ellefson rejoined the band, replacing James LoMenzo.

In late November 2014, Shawn Drover quit the band after ten years, wanting to pursue his own musical interests. This was quickly followed by the departure of Chris Broderick, due to artistic and musical differences. Ellefson denied rumors that the band would disband, and said he and Mustaine would continue working on new music.
In early 2015, Megadeth announced that Brazilian guitarist Kiko Loureiro was hired as the new guitar player for the band to record Megadeth's fifteenth studio album alongside Lamb of God's drummer, Chris Adler. On July 7, 2016, Soilwork's Dirk Verbeuren was announced as Megadeth's new drummer.

Ellefson was dismissed from Megadeth amid allegations of sexual misconduct on May 14, 2021. Months later, former bassist James LoMenzo returned to the line-up for the Metal Tour Of The Year. LoMenzo officially became the band’s new bassist in 2022.

Members

Current

Former

Session

Live

Timeline

Line-ups

References
General

 
 

Specific

Notes

External links

 

 
Megadeth
Articles which contain graphical timelines